Criminal Minded is the debut studio album by hip-hop group Boogie Down Productions, released on March 3, 1987 by B-Boy Records. It is considered a highly influential hip hop album and one of the first in the gangsta rap genre.

Since its release, the album has been sampled, interpolated and paraphrased. Its samples and direct influences were unusual at the time, ranging from liberal use of dancehall reggae (as well as the more commonly used James Brown) to rock music artists such as AC/DC, The Beatles and Billy Joel. The album was eventually certified Gold by the RIAA. The songs "South Bronx" and "The Bridge Is Over" ignited the rivalry with the Brooklyn-bred but Queens resident emcee MC Shan and the Juice Crew. Throughout the album, KRS-One gives honor and praise to Scott La Rock for producing the album and he mostly goes on about the importance of originality and being "real" instead of a "Sucker MC".

In 2003, the album was ranked number 444 on Rolling Stone magazine's list of the 500 greatest albums of all time, and was later ranked number 239 in the 2020 edition.

Background

Production on the LP is credited to  Blastmaster' KRS-One (Lawrence Krisna Parker) and DJ Scott La Rock (Scott Sterling), with a special thanks to Ced-Gee (Cedric Miller) of The Ultramagnetic MCs on the back cover.

The cover, which showcases Parker and Sterling surrounded by an arsenal of weapons, was hip-hop's first major release to feature members brandishing firearms. The album also contained several seminal hardcore songs such as "9mm Goes Bang," one of the first hip-hop songs to be based around a first-person crime narrative, and "P Is Free," which details an encounter with a drug-abusing prostitute.

The liner notes of Criminal Minded read, "Peace to Ron Nelson and the Toronto posse." This statement is evidence of BDP's involvement with Toronto's hip hop scene in the 1980s, which produced artists such as Michie Mee, Dream Warriors, and Maestro Fresh Wes.

Controversy
Initially, the album sold at least several hundred thousand copies; however, the relationship between the group and B-Boy Records quickly deteriorated when the label, headed by Jack Allen and Bill Kamarra, was allegedly slow to pay royalties. A lawsuit was launched, which was eventually settled out-of-court. Having left B-Boy Records, new friend Ice-T introduced BDP to Warner Bros. Records' Benny Medina, head of the label's Black-music division, who promptly agreed to sign the duo in principle to a new record deal. However, it was rescinded after La Rock's death.

By this time, Sterling had befriended a neighborhood teenager named Derrick "D-Nice" Jones, who did a human beatboxing routine for the group. One evening, Jones was assaulted by some local hoodlums and he later called Sterling to run interference. The next day, Sterling and a group of others came to the stoop where the offending parties lived. Sterling's intention was to try and mediate things, but one of the hoods pulled out a gun and began shooting at random. In the ensuing confusion, Sterling was hit in the neck. Critically wounded, he died an hour later in hospital, leaving behind an infant son.

Warner Bros. reneged on the new deal in the aftermath of Sterling's death. Parker, however, decided that the group should continue. A handful of friends were brought into the collective, including Parker's new wife Ms. Melodie and brother Kenny Parker, with whom he had just recently reunited. Original member and Criminal Minded co-producer Lee Smith was dropped by Parker in pursuit of a deal. Signing with Jive/RCA Records, Parker recorded eight albums for that label in a 10-year period, eventually dropping the Boogie Down Productions moniker and billing himself as a solo performer. R.E.M. and others recruited him for collaborations, and he was among the few hip-hop acts at the Beastie Boys' Tibetan Freedom Concerts.

Meanwhile, Criminal Minded became notoriously hard to find, falling in and out of print every few years, surfacing with a different distributor every time. Eventually, the Boston-based independent label LandSpeed Records purchased the rights of the B-Boy Records catalogue, hence a re-release in 2002. An expanded re-release titled The Best of B-Boy Records: Boogie Down Productions includes longer versions of the album's tracks and several 12-inch singles that didn't make Criminal Minded'''s original pressing. On Spotify this bumper pack is simply known as Criminal Minded (Deluxe). The album was re-released again in 2006—original art intact—when LandSpeed became Traffic Entertainment Group.

Critical receptionCriminal Minded has been well received by critics. In 1988, for The Village Voice, Robert Christgau wrote in his "Consumer Guide" column:

In 1998, Criminal Minded was selected by The Source as one of the 100 Best Rap Albums. Vibe included it in their list of the 100 Essential Albums of the 20th Century in 1999, and in 2002, the magazine placed it at number three on their list of the Top 10 Rap Albums. In 2003, the album was ranked number 444 on Rolling Stone magazine's list of the 500 greatest albums of all time, and was later ranked 239 in the 2020 edition.Complex named the song "South Bronx" as the ninth-best hip hop diss song of all-time.

In 2017, rapper MC Ren named Criminal Minded as his all-time favorite hip hop album. MC Ren also heavily sampled "The Bridge Is Over" on his 1992 single "Final Frontier".

Track listing

[*] Bonus track found on later pressings.

Samples

Samples appearing on the album
"Poetry" contains samples from the James Brown recordings "Soul Power Pt. 1", "The Boss", and "Don't Tell It" (scratches by TR Love).

"South Bronx" contains samples from the James Brown recordings "Get Up Offa That Thing" and "Get Up, Get Into It, Get Involved".

"Word from Our Sponsor" contains samples from First Choice's "Love Thang".

"Dope Beat" contains a sample from the AC/DC recording "Back in Black".

"Remix For P is Free" contains a sample from the Yellowman recording "Zungguzungguguzungguzeng".

"The Bridge Is Over" contains the kick and snare drum of the Honey Drippers' “Impeach the President,” an interpolation of a bassline from the Super Cat recording "Boops" (played on the studio piano by KRS-One), and a short melodic and lyrical interpolation of the Billy Joel recording "It's Still Rock and Roll to Me".

"Super Hoe" contains samples from the Captain Sky recording "Super Sporm" and the Esther Williams recording "Last Night Changed it All (I Really Had a Ball)".

"Criminal Minded" contains samples from the Syl Johnson recording "Different Strokes" and the Trouble Funk recording "Let's Get Small", and begins with a melodic and lyrical interpolation of the Beatles recording "Hey, Jude".

Samples from the album by other artists
 "Poetry"
 "Doomsday" by M.F. Doom from the album Operation: Doomsday "The Bridge Is Over"
 "If It's Lovin' that You Want" by Rihanna from the album Music Of The Sun "Destroy & Rebuild" by Nas from the album Stillmatic "Final Frontier" by MC Ren from the album Kizz My Black Azz "Butt In The Meantime" Black Sheep from the album A Wolf in Sheep's Clothing "Brooklyn Took It" by Jeru the Damaja from the album The Sun Rises in the East "South Bronx"
 "Jenny From The Block" by Jennifer Lopez from the album This Is Me...Then "No One Else" by Total from the album Total "KRS-One Attacks" by KRS-One from the album Return of the Boom Bap "Can't Let Her Get Away" by Michael Jackson from the album Dangerous (uncredited)
 "Dope Beat"
 "Form Of Intellect" by Gang Starr from the album Step in the Arena "Basketball Jones" by Barry White and Chris Rock from the soundtrack to Space Jam contains an outro (sung by Rock) which is based on La Rock's outro in this song
 "Remix for P Is Free"
 "Definition" by Black Star from the album Black Star. They also paraphrased lyrics from "Stop The Violence" and "The Bridge Is Over".
 "Live & Direct" by Sugar Ray featuring KRS-One from the album 14:59 "Lil' Putos" by Cypress Hill from the album Black Sunday "Super-Hoe"
 "Superhoes" by Funkdoobiest from the album Brothas Doobie "Dead Bent" by MF Doom from the album Operation: Doomsday "Doo-Wop That Thing" by Lauryn Hill
 Smoove - Footprints "Criminal Minded"
Ruff Ryders interloped a line from this song in "They Ain't Ready"
 "Ex Girl To The Next Girl" by Gang Starr from the album Daily Operation "9mm Goes Bang"
 "Uh Huh" by Method Man
 "9mm" by Freddie Gibbs
 "It's Not a Game" by Big Herk
 "Midnight" by Ice-T from the album "O.G. Original Gangster"
 "Battlefield" by Jordin Sparks from the album Battlefield (uncredited)
 "9mm Goes Bang" appeared in 50 Cent's film Get Rich or Die Tryin' "Illusions" by Cypress Hill from the album Cypress Hill III: Temples of Boom "Bridging the Gap" by Nas from the album Street's Disciple "What Is It" by Baby Bash featuring Sean Kingston from the album Cyclone "Until It's Gone" by Monica from the album New Life "Big Beast" by Killer Mike featuring Bun B, T.I. and Trouble from the album R.A.P. Music''
The P Is Free
 If I Had No Loot by Tony Toni Tone from Sons of Soul

Charts

See also 
 Album era

References

1987 debut albums
Boogie Down Productions albums
Albums produced by KRS-One